Rudford is a village and former civil parish, now in the parish of Rudford and Highleadon, in the Forest of Dean district, in the county of Gloucestershire, England. It is located approximately 4 miles north-west of Gloucester. The local church is dedicated to St. Mary. It is also 5 miles from Newent. In 1931 the parish had a population of 114.

History 
On 1 April 1935 the parish of Highleadon was merged with Rudford, on 16 September 1976 the parish was renamed "Rudford & Highleadon".

References 

Parishes with Forest of Dean. Gloucestershire County Council. Retrieved on 2008-05-01.

External links

Villages in Gloucestershire
Former civil parishes in Gloucestershire
Forest of Dean